Mirri Khurd , also called Kusal Khera, is a village in Asoha block of Unnao district, Uttar Pradesh, India. It has no schools or healthcare facilities. As of 2011, its population is 589, in 109 households.

The 1961 census recorded Mirri Khurd (under the spelling "Miri Khurd") as comprising 1 hamlets, with a total population of 234 (122 male and 112 female), in 40 households and 40 physical houses. The area of the village was given as 420 acres.

References

Villages in Unnao district